Solute carrier family 25, member 29 is a protein that in humans is encoded by the SLC25A29 gene. The gene is also known as CACL and C14orf69. SLC25A29 belongs to a protein family of solute carriers called the mitochondrial carriers.

Model organisms
				
Model organisms have been used in the study of SLC25A29 function. A conditional knockout mouse line, called Slc25a29tm1a(KOMP)Wtsi was generated as part of the International Knockout Mouse Consortium program — a high-throughput mutagenesis project to generate and distribute animal models of disease to interested scientists — at the Wellcome Trust Sanger Institute.

Male and female animals underwent a standardized phenotypic screen to determine the effects of deletion. Twenty four tests were carried out on mutant mice, but no significant abnormalities were observed.

References

Further reading 
 

Human proteins
Genes mutated in mice
Solute carrier family